In the 1885 Iowa State Senate elections Iowa voters elected state senators to serve in the twenty-first Iowa General Assembly. Elections were held in 24 of the state senate's 50 districts. State senators serve four-year terms in the Iowa State Senate.

The general election took place on November 3, 1885.

Following the previous election, Republicans had control of the Iowa Senate with 39 seats to Democrats' 11 seats.

To claim control of the chamber from Republicans, the Democrats needed to net 15 Senate seats.

Republicans maintained control of the Iowa State Senate following the 1885 general election with the balance of power shifting to Republicans holding 31 seats and Democrats having 19 seats (a net gain of 8 seats for Democrats).

Summary of Results
Note: The holdover Senators not up for re-election are not listed on this table.

Source:

Detailed Results
NOTE: The Iowa Official Register does not contain detailed vote totals for state senate elections in 1885.

See also
 Elections in Iowa

References

External links
Iowa Senate Districts 1886-1887 map

Iowa Senate
Iowa
Iowa Senate elections